Frank Ashmore (born June 17, 1945) is an American actor.

Career
He is perhaps best known for his role as "Martin" in the 1983 NBC miniseries V and its 1984 sequel V: The Final Battle. He reprised his role in the pilot episode of V: The Series -- and as Martin's brother "Philip" (A Supreme Commander appointed to investigate the murder of Supreme Commander "Charles", who had married V villainess "Diana" and died on the wedding night from a poisoned drink; he later became a "Fifth Columnist" like Martin).

Ashmore appeared in the 1980 hit comedy film Airplane!, Airplane II: The Sequel and films such as Gable and Lombard (1976), Invisible Strangler (1978), Parts: The Clonus Horror (1979), Monster in the Closet (1986) and Extracted (2012). In 1981, he appeared on both Days of Our Lives as a hit man out to kill Julie Williams and General Hospital as Monica Quartermaine's private investigator. He also had a supporting role in the 2012 independent thriller Extracted.  He made guest appearances on various television shows including Happy Days, The Bob Newhart Show, Battlestar Galactica, Touched by an Angel, The West Wing and the current version of Hawaii Five-O.  In 2010, he had a recurring role in season 4 of The Guild. He voiced Jimmy the Grape in the video game The Darkness II. He voiced Leone "Leo" Galante in the 2010 video game Mafia II,  and its sequel Mafia III. He also voiced Austin Buckell in the 2013 video game Dead Space 3.

Awards
Ashmore won the Los Angeles Drama Critics Circle Award for Featured Performance in 2005. In 2009, he was nominated for Best Actor by the 168 Hour Film Project, a Christian film festival, for the short Stealing Home.

Filmography

Film

Television

Video games

References

External links

1945 births
Living people
American male film actors
American male television actors
Male actors from El Paso, Texas